Listed below are executive orders beginning with order number 13985, presidential proclamations, presidential memoranda, national security memoranda, presidential determinations, presidential sequestration orders, and presidential notices signed by U.S. President Joe Biden.

Executive orders
, President Biden has signed 107 executive orders.

Cumulative number of executive orders signed by Joe Biden

2021

2022

2023

Presidential proclamations

Presidential memoranda

2021

2022

2023

National security memoranda

Presidential determinations

FY2021

FY2022

FY2023

Presidential sequestration orders

Presidential notices

2021

2022

2023

See also 
List of executive actions by Donald Trump, EO #13765–13984 (2017–2021)
List of United States federal executive orders
List of bills in the 117th United States Congress

References

Sources

 

Presidency of Joe Biden
Executive actions
2021-related lists
2022-related lists
2023-related lists
2021 beginnings

 
United States federal policy